FK Ekibastuzets Ekibastuz are a Kazakhstani football club based at the Shakhtyor Stadium in Ekibastuz.

History
Ekibastuzets were founding members of the Kazakhstan Premier League. 

At the end of the 2007 Premier League, they were relegated to the Kazakhstan First Division as a punishment for Match fixing.

Ekibastuzets
1979 : Founded as Ugolshik
1980 : Renamed Ekibastuzets
1993 : Renamed Batyr
2001 : Renamed Ekibastuzets-NK because of joint with Nasha Kampaniya
2002 : Renamed Ekibastuzets

Achievements
Kazakhstan First Division: 1
2002

Runner-up: Season 1993, 1998

References

Ekibastuzets, FC
1979 establishments in the Kazakh Soviet Socialist Republic